Abbie or Abbey Smith may refer to:

Abbey Smith (Misfits)
Abbie Smith, Utah rep in Miss USA 2002

See also
Abigail Smith (disambiguation)